The 1948 Oklahoma A&M Cowboys football team represented Oklahoma Agricultural and Mechanical College (later renamed Oklahoma State University–Stillwater) in the Missouri Valley Conference during the 1948 college football season. In their 10th year under head coach Jim Lookabaugh, the Cowboys compiled a 6–4 record (2–0 against conference opponents), won the Missouri Valley championship, lost to William & Mary in the 1949 Delta Bowl, and outscored opponents by a combined total of 219 to 127.

The team's statistical leaders included halfback Bob Meinert with 571 rushing yards, Jack Hartman with 469 passing yards and 31 points scored, and Bill Long with 234 receiving yards.

Six Oklahoma A&M players received first-team All-Missouri Valley Conference honors in 1948: tackle Charles Shaw, guards Wayne Burrow and D. Meisenheimer, end William Long, and backs Bill Grimes and Bob Meinert.

The team played its home games at Lewis Field in Stillwater, Oklahoma.

Schedule

After the season

The 1949 NFL Draft was held on December 21, 1948. The following Cowboys were selected.

References

Oklahoma AandM
Oklahoma State Cowboys football seasons
Missouri Valley Conference football champion seasons
Oklahoma AM